The circle style Kabaddi World Cup, is an international kabaddi competition administrated by the Government of Punjab (India) contested by men's and women's national teams. The competition has been contested every year since the inaugural tournament in 2010, except for 2015 due to the 2015 Guru Granth Sahib desecration controversy. The women's tournament was introduced in 2012. As of October 2016, every tournament, men's and women's, has been won by India except of the 2020 edition of Kabaddi World Cup won by Pakistan.

Cultural performances
In opening and closing ceremonies of Kabaddi World Cup, there are performances by Punjabi artists.

Format
The current format of the competition involves a round robin group stage, with 4 teams in 2 pools, first and second of the each group progress to the semi-finals.

Summary
Men

Women

Medal table 
Men

Women

References

External links

World Cup
Kabbadi, Circle
2010 establishments in India